Sarolta Kovács (born 12 March 1991) is a Hungarian modern pentathlete. An individual and team World Champion, she competed in the modern pentathlon at the 2012, 2016 and 2020 Summer Olympics.

Career 
In 2016, she was the surprise winner of the UIPM World Championships, as she missed much of the competitive season due to injury.  The championships were held in Moscow, where previously she had won World Championship silver in 2011.

She was also part of the Hungarian teams that won gold at the World Championships in 2016 with Zsofia Foldhazi and Tamara Alekszejev and in 2017 and 2018 with the same teammates, and bronze in 2015 (again with Foldhazi and Alekszejev).  She was part of Hungarian teams that won gold in the women's relay event at the 2011 World Championships (with Leila Gyenesei and Adrienn Toth) and silver in the same event at the 2013 World Championships (with Foldhazi and Gyenesei).

At European level, she won individual silver in 2017, and bronze in 2018.  In the team events, she won gold in the women's relay in 2011 (with Toth and Gyenesei), bronze in the mixed relay in 2017 (with Robert Kasza) and 2018 (with Demeter Bence), gold in the women's team event in 2011 (with Toth and Gyenesei) and 2018 (with Foldhazi and Alekszejev) and bronze in the same event in 2012 (with Toth and Gyenesei).

References

External links
 
 
 
 

1991 births
Living people
Hungarian female modern pentathletes
Modern pentathletes at the 2012 Summer Olympics
Modern pentathletes at the 2016 Summer Olympics
Modern pentathletes at the 2020 Summer Olympics
Medalists at the 2020 Summer Olympics
Olympic medalists in modern pentathlon
Olympic bronze medalists for Hungary
Olympic modern pentathletes of Hungary
World Modern Pentathlon Championships medalists
People from Tapolca
Sportspeople from Veszprém County